Sri Rampai LRT station is a rapid transit station in northern Kuala Lumpur, Malaysia, forming part of the Kelana Jaya Line (formerly known as PUTRA). The station, named after the nearby Taman Sri Rampai housing estate to the west, is located along the border between Taman Sri Rampai and Wangsa Maju to the east.

History

While construction of the station started along with the rest of the line in 1996, it was halted in 1997 due to low population in the surrounding area and the cancellation of a housing project nearby. While the rest of the line opened in 1999 with Sri Rampai station listed on transit maps, Sri Rampai was effectively a ghost station with all trains programmed to simply pass through.

On the evening of August 25, 2006, the station's tracks were inundated by water from a flash flood, disrupting services along the entire Kelana Jaya Line for several hours and causing major passenger congestion between the KLCC station and the Kuala Lumpur Sentral station. Services were gradually restored by 8:30 pm (MST).

Refurbishment of the station resumed on September 2008, likely in response to new property developments in the area, including Wangsa Walk Mall and a local AEON BiG (formerly known as "Carrefour") supermarket. Work on the station was complete early December 2010, and the station began revenue service on 24 December 2010.

Design
The station is a two-level subsurface station, with the platform areas (containing two side platforms) constructed below the surface, while the rest of the structure is located above on the surface. The station is the only kind along the line to be at-grade, in comparison to other stations' elevated and underground designs.

Places of interest
 Wangsa Walk Mall
 Aeon Big Wangsa Maju

Bus Services

Feeder buses

Other buses

Incident 
On 28 March 2012, a 22-year-old man who was using the restroom suffered injuries to his thighs and the back of his body when the toilet bowl suddenly exploded. Investigations revealed that the explosive was a home-made firecracker. The victim spent a week in hospital.

See also

 List of rail transit stations in Klang Valley

References

External links 
Sri Rampai LRT Station | mrt.com.my

Kelana Jaya Line
Railway stations opened in 2010